This is a list of Punjabi tribes. More specifically, these are tribes and castes located within the Punjab region of the Indian subcontinent—including those that may not be officially recognized by state governments.

A
 Ad-Dharmi
 Agrawal
 Aheri
 Ahir
 Ahluwalia
 Arain
 Arora
 Ansari
 Abraham

B 
 Brahman
 Bazigar

C 
 Chhimba Darzi
 Churigar

D 
 Dhanial
 Dhobi
 Dhund Abbasi
 Dogar

G 
 Gujjar
 Gakhar
 Gabol

H

J 
 Janjua Rajput
 Jarral
 Jatt
 Jat Muslim
 Jhinwar
 Joiya

K 
 Khokhar Jat
 Khokhar Khanzada
 Kharal
 Kalal
 Kamboh
 Khagga
 Khandowa
 Khatri

L 
 Labana
 Lohar
 Langrial

M 
 Mahtam
 Malik
 Maliar
 Mazhabi
 Mughal
 Mirasi
 Mochi Hindu
 Mochi Musalman
 Mohyal

N 
 Nalband
 Nat
 Noongar

P 
 Penja
 Perna

Q 
 Qalandar

R 
 Rai Sikh
 Rajput
 Ramgarhia
 Ramdasia
 Ranghar
 Ravidassia
 Rawal

S 
 Sahi
 Saini
 Sansi
 Sapera
 Satti
 Sehgal
 Shaikh of Punjab
 Sikligar
 Sunar

T 
 Tarar
 Teli
 Tarkhan

See also 
 Punjabi people
 List of Seraiki tribes
 Scheduled Castes and Scheduled Tribes
 Ethnic groups in Pakistan

References 

Punjabi
Punjabi